Vox Populi, Vox Dei is a Whig tract of 1709, titled after a Latin phrase meaning "the voice of the people is the voice of God". It was expanded in 1710 and later reprintings as The Judgment of whole Kingdoms and Nations: Concerning the Rights, Power, and Prerogative of Kings, and the Rights, Privileges, and Properties of the People. The author is unknown but was probably either Robert Ferguson or Thomas Harrison. There is no evidence for persistent attribution to Daniel Defoe or John Somers as authors.

The most cited section of the revised (1710) version of the pamphlet read:

The 1709 tract's use of the Latin phrase was consistent with earlier usage of vox populi, vox Dei in English political history since at least as early as 1327 when the Archbishop of Canterbury Walter Reynolds brought charges against King Edward II in a sermon "Vox populi, vox Dei". From Reynolds onwards English political use of the phrase was favorable, not referencing an alternative context of the usage by Alcuin (c. 735 – 804) who in a letter advised the emperor Charlemagne to resist such a dangerous democratic idea on the grounds that "the riotousness of the crowd is always very close to madness".

Vox Populi, Vox Dei: being true Maxims of Government was the next year, 1710, republished under the title of The Judgment of whole Kingdoms and Nations, with considerable alterations. The 10th printing of the revised tract was in 1771.

Other works

The title Vox Populi, Vox Dei was also borrowed in a Jacobite pamphlet to argue against the Whigs in 1719, resulting in the hanging of the young printer John Matthews.

References

Books about politics of England
1709 books